René Farwig (born 30 September 1935) is a Bolivian alpine skier. He competed in two events at the 1956 Winter Olympics.

References

1935 births
Living people
Bolivian male alpine skiers
Olympic alpine skiers of Bolivia
Alpine skiers at the 1956 Winter Olympics
Sportspeople from Valencia